Aditi Ramesh is a Lawyer turned Indian independent Singer-Songwriter, based in Mumbai. She is trained in Carnatic Music and has been part of several bands naming few of them are Ladies Compartment and Voctronica and has also performed in Mood Indigo (festival) in IIT Bombay.Sambar Soul and Shakti is one of her latest releases.

References

Indian singer-songwriters
Indian lawyers
Year of birth missing (living people)
Living people